is a Japanese professional wrestler currently working for the Japanese promotion DDT Pro-Wrestling. He is known for being one of the youngest debuting wrestlers, as well as one of the youngest recognized champions in professional wrestling.

Professional wrestling career

DDT Pro-Wrestling (2016-present)
Yuni made his professional wrestling debut at the early age of 8, at DDT Osaka Octopus 2016 on December 4, where he teamed up with Shigehiro Irie and Yasu Urano, picking up a victory over New Wrestling Aidoru (Makoto Oishi, Mao and Shunma Katsumata). Over his debut, Yuni was compared to other early-starting wrestlers such as Ram Kaicho and Riho who also debuted under the age of ten. 

Yuni is a former multiple-time Ironman Heavymetalweight Champion, having won the title for the first time at DDT Who's Gonna Top? DDT Dramatic General Election 2017 on September 24, where he defeated his trainer Makoto Oishi for the belt, making him one of the youngest recognized champions in the Japanese independent scene. Yuni currently wrestles under the gimmick of "El Unicorn", a masked superstar in the "DDTeeeen" division which is dedicated to the younger talent of the roster, mainly consisting of rookies. Sometimes they team up with the main roster superstars in various matches. At one of this kinds of events, Yuni fell short to Yousei ☆ Estrella.

Since being a full-time roster member, Yuni made appearances in several of the promotion's signature events such as the DDT Judgement. He marked his first appearance at Judgement 2017: DDT 20th Anniversary on March 20, where he teamed up with Jaguar Yokota, Keisuke Ishii and Masahiro Takanashi to defeat Toru Owashi, Kazuki Hirata, Antonio Honda and Ladybeard. At Judgement 2019: DDT 22nd Anniversary on February 17, he participated in a Rumble rules match for the Ironman Heavymetalweight Championship won by Saki Akai and also involving other notable opponents, both male and female such as El Lindaman, Mina Shirakawa, Gorgeous Matsuno, Asuka, Gota Ihashi, Hoshitango, Yuka Sakazaki and others.

Championships and accomplishments
DDT Pro-Wrestling
Ironman Heavymetalweight Championship (5 times)

References

2008 births
Living people
Japanese male professional wrestlers
21st-century professional wrestlers
Japanese people
People from Osaka Prefecture
Sportspeople from Osaka Prefecture
Ironman Heavymetalweight Champions